Voil may refer to:

People
 Ralph De Voil, English priest
 Walter de Voil, Scottish priest

Places
 Loch Voil, Scotland